The California State Teachers' Retirement System (CalSTRS) provides retirement, disability and survivor benefits for California's 965,000 prekindergarten through community college educators and their families. CalSTRS was established by law in 1913 and is part of the State of California's Government Operations Agency. As of September 2020, CalSTRS is the largest teachers' retirement fund in the United States. CalSTRS is also currently the eleventh largest public pension fund in the world. As of October 31, 2020, CalSTRS managed a portfolio worth $254.7 billion.

Membership
CalSTRS members, as of June 30, 2019, include employees of approximately 1,778 employers:
 School districts
 Community college districts
 County offices of education
 Regional occupational programs

Teachers' Retirement Fund
The Teachers' Retirement Fund is a special trust fund established by law that holds the assets of the following programs:

 Defined Benefit
 Defined Benefit Supplement 
 Cash Balance Benefit

The assets come from contributions by members, employing school districts, investment earnings and appropriations from the State of California's General Fund. The fund's investments create a stream of income to add to those assets.

The CalSTRS investment portfolio includes stocks, bonds, real estate and short-term investments.

Finances
As of June 30, 2019, CalSTRS managed a portfolio worth approximately $239 billion and pension liabilities of $329 billion, leaving a net pension liability of $90 billion at that date.

Governance
The Teachers' Retirement Board is responsible for maintaining the Teachers' Retirement Fund in order to pay benefits to CalSTRS members and their survivors.

Teachers' Retirement Board
The Teachers' Retirement Board sets policies, makes rules for and administers CalSTRS. The Board is also responsible for ensuring benefits are paid by the system in accordance with law.

The 12-member Teachers' Retirement Board is made up of:

 Three member-elected positions representing current educators
 Five members appointed by the Governor of California and confirmed by the California Senate
 A retired CalSTRS member 
 Three public representatives 
 A school board representative 
 Four ex officio members:
 Director of Finance
 State Controller
 State Superintendent of Public Instruction
 State Treasurer

Executive staff
In February 2002, the board appointed Jack Ehnes as chief executive officer of CalSTRS to administer the system consistent with the board's policies and rules. The board also selected a chief investment officer, (CIO) Christopher J. Ailman, to direct the investments of the Teachers' Retirement Fund in accordance with board policy.

In June 2021, Jack Ehnes retired from the position, and chief operating officer Cassandra Lichnock filled the position.

Advisory committees
Two advisory committees meet regularly to provide forums for active participation in the formation of CalSTRS policies and procedures. The Employer Advisory Committee is composed of county and district employer representatives and CalSTRS staff and meets quarterly, and the Client Advisory Committee includes CalSTRS staff and members from various organizations representing CalSTRS members and benefit recipients and meets regularly coinciding with Board meeting dates.

Operations
The board has supported a variety of corporate governance initiatives and actions aimed at keeping the fund stable.  A few of the actions taken include:

 Support of the Sarbanes-Oxley Act of 2002 that brings dramatic new standards to the corporate boardrooms and accounting profession.
 Encouragement of the SEC's efforts to adopt tough regulations to rein in lax business practices 
 Discussions with individual corporate leaders to express CalSTRS interest in good corporate governance practices.
 Litigation to pursue both financial remedies for the system as well as governance reforms

On May 28, 2009, CalSTRS announced that individual proxy votes will be publicly available online through a partnership with ProxyDemocracy.org, a nonprofit organization that offers free online investment information about portfolio companies.

Like other large pension plans, CalSTRS had previously announced its proxy-vote intentions on selective companies. The addition of online disclosure opens the process to all CalSTRS portfolio companies, allowing other shareholders to know how the pension fund will vote.

As of May 2009, CalSTRS holds stock in over 3,800 North American companies.

After the December 14, 2012 Sandy Hook Elementary School shooting, California's treasurer, Bill Lockyer, considered ordering CalSTRS to eliminate investments in gun manufacturers. On January 9, 2013, the Teachers' Retirement Board Investment Committee directed staff to "begin the process of divestment from firearm companies that manufacture weapons that are illegal in California," and CalSTRS divested from Sturm Ruger and the American Outdoor Brands Corporation, (formerly Smith & Wesson).

In January 2018, CalSTRS issued a public letter to Apple Inc. alongside JANA Partners, LLC called "Think Differently About Kids". The letter encouraged Apple to find new ways to limit the effects of smartphone use on children.

CalSTRS is among the signatories of the "Principles for a Responsible Civilian Firearms Industry," which seeks to engage firearms manufacturers, dealers, and retailers in promoting gun safety.

Since the mid-2010s, activists have increasingly called for CalSTRS to cut financial ties with fossil fuel companies. In 2015, Kevin de León introduced CalSTRS and CalPERS coal divestment legislation and the California Democratic Party passed a resolution in support of fossil fuel divestment. Kevin de León's bill passed and CalSTRS was required to sell all holdings in companies that received at least 50% of their revenue from thermal coal. State Senator Lena Gonzalez introduced broader fossil fuel divestment legislation in February 2022. The CalSTRS board opposed this legislation. It passed the California State Senate but was halted in the assembly by Jim Cooper. As of 2022, CalSTRS has about $4.1 billion invested in oil and gas companies.

Headquarters

Opened in June 2009, the CalSTRS headquarters building in West Sacramento is expected to meet members' needs through 2049.  Growth in membership, the difference and complexity of the needs of a new generation of retiring teachers, and the need to operate more efficiently and sustainably led to the decision to build a new headquarters. The building, a $266 million, 13-story office tower above two levels of public space, is part of the Sacramento Riverfront Master Plan.

The headquarters was designed to meet the Gold certification LEED designation set by the U.S. Green Building Council. Its construction was done by numerous Local Unions and with the aid of Architectural Glass and Aluminum which served as the Glazing Contractor on the project. It is expected that construction of the CalSTRS headquarters will add momentum to former California Governor Arnold Schwarzenegger's push for "green" buildings and speed up a similar movement in private construction. A few of the features designed into the building to qualify for LEED Gold certification are:

 Water: low-flow plumbing, efficient irrigation to water native plants that don't need a lot of water.
 Materials: At least 10 percent of construction materials include recycled content.
 Reduced construction greenhouse gas emissions: At least 20 percent of construction materials come from within  of the project site.
 Natural light: At least 90 percent of people in the building have a direct line of sight to a window to reduce lighting needs and attempt to increase productivity.

In October 2011, the building received USGBC's Platinum certification in Existing Building and Operations Maintenance.

See also
 California Public Employees' Retirement System (CalPERS)

References

External links

 Teachers' Retirement System in the California Code of Regulations
CalSTRS's proxy voting profile from ProxyDemocracy.org
CalSTRS Public Profile from SWFI

State agencies of California
Public pension funds in the United States
Education in California
Government agencies established in 1913
Buildings and structures in Yolo County, California
1913 establishments in California